Foss v Harbottle (1843) 2 Hare 461, 67 ER 189 is a leading English precedent in corporate law. In any action in which a wrong is alleged to have been done to a company, the proper claimant is the company itself. This is known as "the proper plaintiff rule", and the several important exceptions that have been developed are often described as "exceptions to the rule in Foss v Harbottle". Amongst these is the "derivative action", which allows a minority shareholder to bring a claim on  behalf of the company. This applies in situations of "wrongdoer control" and is, in reality, the only true exception to the rule. The rule in Foss v Harbottle is best seen as the starting point for minority shareholder remedies.

The rule has now largely been partly codified and displaced in the United Kingdom by the Companies Act 2006 sections 260–263, setting out a statutory derivative claim.

Facts
Richard Foss and Edward Starkie Turton were two minority shareholders in the "Victoria Park Company". The company had been set up in September 1835 to buy  of land near Manchester and, according to the report,

enclosing and planting the same in an ornamental and park-like manner, and erecting houses thereon with attached gardens and pleasure-grounds, and selling, letting or otherwise disposing thereof.

This became Victoria Park, Manchester. Subsequently, an Act of Parliament incorporated the company. The claimants alleged that property of the company had been misapplied and wasted and various mortgages were given improperly over the company's property. They asked that the guilty parties be held accountable to the company and that a receiver be appointed.

The defendants were the five company directors (Thomas Harbottle, Joseph Adshead, Henry Byrom, John Westhead, Richard Bealey) and the solicitors and architect (Joseph Denison, Thomas Bunting and Richard Lane); and also H. Rotton, E. Lloyd, T. Peet, J. Biggs and S. Brooks, the several assignees of Byrom, Adshead and Westhead, who had become bankrupts.

Judgment
Wigram VC dismissed the claim and held that when a company is wronged by its directors it is only the company that has standing to sue. In effect the court established two rules. Firstly, the "proper plaintiff rule" is that a wrong done to the company may be vindicated by the company alone. Secondly, the "majority rule principle" states that if the alleged wrong can be confirmed or ratified by a simple majority of members in a general meeting, then the court will not interfere (legal term).

Developments
The rule was later extended to cover cases where what is complained of is some internal irregularity in the operation of the company. However, the internal irregularity must be capable of being confirmed/sanctioned by the majority.

The rule in Foss v Harbottle has another important implication. A shareholder cannot generally bring a claim to recover any reflective loss – a diminution in the value of his or her shares in circumstances where the diminution arises because the company has suffered an actionable loss. The proper course is for the company to bring the action and recoup the loss with the consequence that the value of the shares will be restored.

Because Foss v Harbottle leaves the minority in an unprotected position, exceptions have arisen and statutory provisions have come into being which provide some protection for the minority. By far and away the most important protection is the unfair prejudice action in ss. 994-6 of the Companies Act 2006 (UK) (s 232 Corporations Act 2001 in Australia). Also, there is a new statutory derivate action available under ss 260–269 of the 2006 Act (and s 236 Corporations Act 2001 in Australia).

Exceptions to the rule
There are certain exceptions to the rule in Foss v. Harbottle, where litigation will be allowed. The following exceptions protect basic minority rights, which are necessary to protect regardless of the majority's vote.

1. Ultra vires and illegality
The directors or controlling shareholders of a company may not use their control of the company to commit acts which would be ultra vires or illegal.

s 39 Companies Act 2006 for the rules on corporate capacity
Smith v Croft (No 2) and Cockburn v. Newbridge Sanitary Steam Laundry Co. [1915] 1 IR 237, 252–59 (per O'Brien LC and Holmes LJ) for the illegality point

2. Actions requiring a special majority
If some special voting procedure would be necessary under the company's constitution or under the Companies Act, it would defeat both if that could be sidestepped by ordinary resolutions of a simple majority, and no redress for aggrieved minorities to be allowed.

Edwards v Halliwell [1950] 2 All ER 1064

3. Invasion of individual rights
Pender v Lushington (1877) 6 Ch D 70, per Jessel MR

...and see again, Edwards v Halliwell [1950] 2 All ER 1064

4. "Frauds on the minority"
Atwool v Merryweather (1867) LR 5 EQ 464n, per Page Wood VC
Gambotto v WCP Limited (1995) 182 CLR 432 (Aus)
Daniels v Daniels (1978) 
fraud in the context of derivative action means abuse of power whereby the directors or majority, who are in control of the company, secure a benefit at the expense of the company

...and see Greenhalgh v Arderne Cinemas Ltd for an example of what was not a fraud on the minority

See also
UK company law

References

1843 in case law
United Kingdom company case law
1843 in British law
Court of Chancery cases